Joseph S. Manning (April 13, 1845December 27, 1905) was a private in the United States Army and a Medal of Honor recipient for his role in the American Civil War.

Medal of Honor citation
Rank and organization: Private, Company K, 29th Massachusetts Infantry. Place and date. At Fort Sanders, Knoxville, Tenn., November 29, 1863. Entered service at:------. Birth: Ipswich, Mass. Date of issue: December 1, 1864.

Citation:

Capture of flag of 16th Georgia Infantry (C.S.A.).

See also
List of Medal of Honor recipients
List of American Civil War Medal of Honor recipients: M–P

Notes

References

1845 births
1905 deaths
United States Army Medal of Honor recipients
United States Army soldiers
Union Army soldiers
People from Ipswich, Massachusetts
People of Massachusetts in the American Civil War
American Civil War recipients of the Medal of Honor